The Addison Hill House is a historic house located in Arlington, Massachusetts.

Description and history 
The -story wood-frame house was built in the first half of the 19th century for Addison Hill, whose family dominated the upland area of Arlington in that period. The house is an excellent local example of transitional Greek Revival-Italianate styling. Its basic massing is Greek Revival, as is its front porch, but its eaves have double brackets typical of Italianate styling, and the cupola is also a distinctive Italianate touch.

The house was listed on the National Register of Historic Places on September 27, 1985.

See also
National Register of Historic Places listings in Arlington, Massachusetts

References

Houses on the National Register of Historic Places in Arlington, Massachusetts
Houses in Arlington, Massachusetts
Italianate architecture in Massachusetts
Greek Revival houses in Massachusetts